Tayseer Abu Sneineh (alt. Tisir Abu Sneina) is a Palestinian Arab politician, a former member of the Fatah party, and Mayor of Hebron, in the West Bank. He was convicted by Israel for taking part in the 1980 Hebron terrorist attack, who caused death to 6 unarmed civilians. He was elected Mayor of Hebron on 14 May 2017. Abu Sneina has been lecturing voluntarily to Palestinian youth on the 1980 terrorist act.

Background
Sneinah is a former math teacher and a graduate of the University of Jordan, in Amman.

Political career
Abu Sneineh was appointed in 1993 to the waqf that administers the Ibrahimi Mosque in Cave of the Patriarchs.  Jewish groups protested his appointment. He was elected as the mayor after heading the victorious Fatah party's electoral list in Hebron during the 2017 Palestinian local elections.

During the 2021–22 Palestinian local elections, he split from Fatah and formed his own independent list. Abu Sneineh caused controversy by making comments about offering cash to anyone who killed stray dogs in November 2022, before taking back his comments and claiming that he was not being serious but only making suggestion.

1980 Hebron attack
Abu Sneineh was convicted in the 1980 Hebron attack.

References

People convicted on terrorism charges
Fatah members
People from Hebron
Mayors of Hebron
People convicted of murder by Israel
Palestinian people convicted of murder
Palestinian people imprisoned by Israel